Teeranun Chiangta is a retired male badminton player from Thailand.

Career
Chiangta competed in badminton at the 1992 Summer Olympics in men's singles. He lost in the third round to Hermawan Susanto, of Indonesia, 15-7, 15-8. He also won bronze medals at 1991 Southeast Asian Games and 1995 Southeast Asian Games.

References
sports-reference.com

Living people
Teeranun Chiangta
Badminton players at the 1992 Summer Olympics
Teeranun Chiangta
Badminton players at the 1994 Asian Games
Year of birth missing (living people)
Teeranun Chiangta